Yarmukhametovo (Yärmöxämät) is a rural locality (a village) in Yaratovsky Selsoviet, Baymaksky District, Bashkortostan, Russia. The population was 182 as of 2010. There are 4 streets.

Geography 
Yarmukhametovo is located 39 km west of Baymak (the district's administrative centre) by road. Gadelbayevo is the nearest rural locality.

References 

Rural localities in Baymaksky District